Pet Sematary is a 1983 horror novel by American writer Stephen King. The novel was nominated for a World Fantasy Award for Best Novel in 1984, and adapted into two films: one in 1989 and another in 2019. In November 2013, PS Publishing released Pet Sematary in a limited 30th-anniversary edition.

Plot 
Louis Creed, a doctor from Chicago, is appointed director of the University of Maine's campus health service. He moves to a large house near the small town of Ludlow with his wife Rachel, their two young children, Ellie and Gage, and Ellie's cat, Winston Churchill ("Church"). From the moment they arrive, the family runs into trouble: Ellie hurts her knee, and Gage is stung by a bee. Their new neighbor, an elderly man named Jud Crandall, comes to help. He warns Louis and Rachel about the highway that runs past their house, which is frequented by speeding trucks.

Jud and Louis quickly become close friends. Since Louis's father died when he was three, he sees Jud as a surrogate father. A few weeks after the Creeds move in, Jud takes the family on a walk in the woods behind their home. A well-tended path leads to a pet cemetery (misspelled "sematary" on the sign), where the children of the town bury their deceased animals. The outing provokes a heated argument between Louis and Rachel the next day. Rachel disapproves of discussing death, and she worries about how Ellie may be affected by what she saw at the "sematary." It is explained later that Rachel was traumatized by the early death of her sister, Zelda, from spinal meningitis—an issue that is brought up several times in flashbacks. Louis empathizes with his wife and blames her parents for her trauma, who left Rachel at home alone with her sister when she died.

Louis himself has a traumatic experience during the first week of classes. Victor Pascow, a student who has been fatally injured in an automobile accident, addresses his dying words to Louis personally, even though the two men are strangers. On the night following Pascow's death, Louis experiences what he believes is a very vivid dream in which he meets Pascow's ghost, who leads him to the deadfall at the back of the "sematary" and warns him not to go beyond there. Louis wakes up in bed the next morning, convinced it was, in fact, a dream—until he finds his feet and bedsheets covered with dried mud and pine needles. Nevertheless, Louis dismisses the dream as the product of the stress he experienced during Pascow's death, coupled with his wife's lingering anxieties about the subject of death.

On Halloween, Jud's wife Norma suffers a near-fatal heart attack but makes a quick recovery thanks to Louis's help. Jud is grateful and decides to repay Louis after Church is run over outside his home around Thanksgiving. Rachel and the kids are visiting Rachel's parents in Chicago, but Louis frets over breaking the bad news to Ellie. Sympathizing with Louis, Jud takes him to the "sematary", supposedly to bury Church. But instead of stopping there, Jud leads Louis farther on to "the real cemetery": an ancient burial ground that was once used by the Miꞌkmaq Tribe. There, Louis buries the cat on Jud's instruction. The next afternoon, Church returns home; the usually vibrant and lively cat now acts ornery and, in Louis's words, "a little dead". Church hunts for mice and birds, ripping them apart without eating them. He also smells so bad that Ellie no longer wants him in her room at night. Jud confirms that Church has been resurrected and that Jud himself once buried his dog there when he was younger. Louis, deeply disturbed, begins to wish that he had not buried Church there.

Several months later, two-year-old Gage is killed by a speeding truck. Overcome with despair, Louis considers bringing his son back to life with the help of the burial ground. Jud, guessing what Louis is planning, attempts to dissuade him by telling him the story of Timmy Baterman, the last person who was resurrected by the burial ground. Timmy Baterman was killed in action during World War II. Timmy's body was shipped back to the United States, and his father Bill buried Timmy in the burial ground. Timmy returned malevolent, terrorizing the people of the town with secrets that Jud asserts he had no earthly way of knowing. Timmy was stopped by his father, Bill, who killed Timmy and set their house on fire before shooting himself. Jud states that he believes that whatever came back was not Timmy, but a "demon" that had possessed his corpse. He concludes that "sometimes, dead is better" and states that "the place has a power... its own evil purpose", and that it may have caused Gage's death because Jud introduced Louis to it.

Despite Jud's warning and his own reservations about the idea, Louis's grief and guilt spur him to carry out his plan. Louis exhumes Gage's body from his grave and inters him in the burial ground. Gage is resurrected, entirely different from when he was alive. Now malicious in both his words and actions, he finds one of Louis's scalpels and kills both Jud and Rachel. Louis kills both Church and Gage with lethal injections of morphine from his medical supply stock.

Louis, driven completely insane by grief, burns the Crandall house down before returning to the burial ground with his wife's corpse, thinking that if he buries the body faster than he did Gage's, there will be a different result. One of his colleagues, Steve Masterton, notices him walking into the woods with Rachel's body. Steve, while fearful and concerned, is influenced by the power of the burial ground too, and even considers helping Louis bury Rachel, but he flees in terror and eventually moves away to St. Louis. Later, Louis sits indoors alone, playing solitaire, and Rachel's reanimated corpse walks up behind him and drops a cold hand on his shoulder, while its voice rasps, "Darling."

Background
In 1979, King was a "writer-in-residence" at the University of Maine and the house he was renting was adjacent to a major road where dogs and cats were often killed by oncoming trucks. After his daughter's cat was killed by a truck along that road, he explained the death of the pet to his daughter and buried the cat. Three days later, King imagined what would happen if a family suffered the same tragedy but the cat came back to life "fundamentally wrong".

He then imagined what would happen if that family's young son were also killed by a passing truck. He decided to write a book based on these ideas, and that the book would be a re-telling of "The Monkey's Paw" (1902), a short story by W. W. Jacobs about parents whose son resurrects after they wish for that to happen.

King has gone on record stating that of all the novels he has written, Pet Sematary is the one which genuinely scared him the most. The first draft was completed in May 1979.

Adaptations

Films 
The first film adaptation, Pet Sematary, was released in 1989. Directed by Mary Lambert, it starred Dale Midkiff as Louis, Fred Gwynne as Jud, Denise Crosby as Rachel, Brad Greenquist as Victor, Miko Hughes as Gage, and twins Blaze Berdahl and Beau Berdahl as Ellie. King wrote the screenplay and had a cameo as a minister. Male actor Andrew Hubatsek portrayed Zelda because the filmmakers felt that a grown man playing a disabled, deformed teenage girl would make the character more hideous and frightening. The film received mixed reviews, but it was a commercial success. A sequel, Pet Sematary Two, was released in 1992.

A second film adaptation of the novel was released on April 5, 2019. Directed by Dennis Widmyer and Kevin Kölsch, the film stars Jason Clarke as Louis Creed, Amy Seimetz as Rachel Creed, John Lithgow as Jud Crandall, Jeté Laurence as Ellie Creed, and twins Hugo Lavoie and Lucas Lavoie as Gage Creed.

In March 2019, Lorenzo di Bonaventura stated that discussions of the development of a prequel Pet Sematary (2019 film) had begun. In February 2021, the film was officially green-lit with Jeff Buhler and di Bonaventura returning in their roles as screenwriter and producer, respectively. The project will be released via streaming, as a Paramount+ exclusive film.

On December 7, 2021, director Guillermo del Toro said that he would love to make his own version of Pet Sematary saying "You know the novel that I would have killed to adapt, and I know there’s two versions of it, and I still think maybe in a deranged universe I get to do it again one day is Pet Sematary. Because it not only has the very best final couple of lines, but it scared me when I was a young man. As a father, I now understand it better than I ever would have, and it scares me a hundred times more." del Toro also pointed out scenes from King's book that were left out of both film versions. "For me, the best scene in that book is when [Louis] opens Gage’s coffin, and for a second he thinks the head is gone, because this black fungi from the grave has grown like a fuzz over the kid’s face. … I think you cannot spare those details and think that you’re honoring that book. One of the things I thought about Pet Sematary that we would do in post is when the dead return, when Gage returns, I’d spend an inordinate amount of money taking out the sheen from his eyes. So that the eyes are dull.”

Radio 

In 1997, BBC Radio 4 broadcast a dramatization of the story in six half-hour episodes, later re-edited into three hour-long episodes. It was adapted by Gregory Evans and starred John Sharian as Louis Creed, Briony Glassco as Rachel Creed and Lee Montague as Jud Crandall. The production was directed by Gordon House.

Music 
The Ramones recorded a song of the same name as the theme for the 1989 film adaptation. It appeared on their album Brain Drain. It was later covered by the band Starcrawler for the 2019 film.

References

External links 
 

 
1983 American novels
American horror novels
American fantasy novels adapted into films
American zombie novels
Demons in written fiction
Fiction about cemeteries
Ghost stories
Novels by Stephen King
Novels set in Maine
Novels set in Chicago
Doubleday (publisher) books
Novels about spirit possession
Novels adapted into radio programs
Fiction about resurrection
Third-person narrative novels